A shirtdress is a style of women's dress that borrows details from a man's shirt. These can include a collar, a button front, or cuffed sleeves. Often, these dresses are made up in crisp fabrics including cotton or silk, much like a men's dress shirt would be. As they are typically cut without a seam at the waist, these dresses often have a looser fit, usually relying on a belt to define the waist. Button fronts and a forgiving fit make this a flattering look for most body types.

History

Shirtdresses were sometimes called "shirtwaist dresses" when they were fashionable during the 1950s. The 1950s version of the shirtdress was launched as part of Christian Dior's post–World War II "New Look" couture designs, with a full skirt held up by wearing a crinoline. They often featured a notched collar, and elbow-length sleeves with cuffs. More informal versions of the shirtdress, made of cotton, but retaining the full skirt and collar, became a staple part of many women's wardrobes during the 1950s, with designers such as Anne Fogarty becoming known for their versions of this style. A 1957 issue of Life magazine includes a photo of a typical cotton shirtdress selling for $25 in New York City.

A variation of the original shirtdress is the "T-shirt dress". T-shirt dresses began being produced in the 1960s, and are simply an elongated version of a T-shirt.

See also

 1945–60 in fashion

References

External links
 

Dresses
History of fashion
20th-century fashion